The 1896 Detroit College Tigers football team represented Detroit College (renamed the University of Detroit in 1911) during the 1896 college football season. Detroit outscored opponents by a combined total of 66 to 40 and finished with a 5–2 record in their first year of intercollegiate football.  The team's head coach was William S. Robinson.

In the only intercollegiate football game of the season, Detroit was shut out by St. Ignatius College by a 20 to 0 score on Thanksgiving Day.

Leo J. Keena played at the fullback position for the 1896 Detroit team, and later played for Michigan from 1897 to 1899. Ernest O'Brien was the captain of the 1896 team.

Schedule

Players
The team included the following players:
 Francis T. Atkinson, quarterback
 Ernest A. O'Brien, halfback
 W. Alfred Debo, halfback
 Leo J. Keena, fullback
 William Van Dyke, center
 James I. Atkinson, guard
 Maurice W. Chawke, guard
 C. O'Reilly "Riley" Riley Atkinson, tackle
 Robert E. Lee, tackle
 John J. Walsh, tackle
 Alfred B. Moran, end
 Dohaney, end
 Frederick V. Burnham, end
 Otto F. Lang, end

References

Detroit College Tigers
Detroit Titans football seasons
Detroit College Tigers football
Detroit College Tigers football